Toco is a village on the island of Trinidad.

Toco or Tocos may also refer to:

Places
 Toco Municipality, a municipal section in Bolivia
 Toco, Cochabamba, a town in Toco Municipality
 Toco, Texas, a city in the United States
 Tocos do Moji, a municipality in Brazil
 Toco Hills, a neighborhood in North Druid Hills, Georgia

Other
 Toco toucan, a species of bird
 Cardiotocograph, a type of hospital equipment
 Tocos, an alternative name for rice bran solubles